Perth College is an independent Anglican day and boarding school for girls located in Mount Lawley, an inner northern suburb of Perth, Western Australia.  The school maintains a non-selective enrolment policy and currently has approximately 1,000 students from Kindergarten to Year 12, including 110 boarders from Year 7 onwards.

Perth College is affiliated with the Association of Heads of Independent Schools of Australia (AHISA), the Junior School Heads Association of Australia (JSHAA), the Association of Independent Schools of Western Australia, the Australian Boarding Schools Association (ABSA) and the Alliance of Girls' Schools Australia (AGSA).  The school is also a member of the Independent Girls' Schools Sports Association (IGSSA).

History
Founded in 1902 by the Community of the Sisters of the Church, an Anglican religious order, Perth College is the oldest Anglican girls' school in Western Australia. The school first commenced in St Mary's Hall in Colin Street, West Perth with 32 girls. The demand for the introduction of boarding students increased and, as a result, Hawkesbury, situated near Kings Park was opened in 1903.

Due to the development of Hawkesbury for boarders and Cowandilla for the junior students, together with the amalgamation of other subsidiary schools under the control of the Sisters of the Church, the school moved to the Mount Lawley site in 1916.

Perth College was used during World War II as a base of operations for the army. The flagpole which stands at the front of the school was a gift.

Perth College came under the control of the Anglican Province of Western Australia in 1968.

The school has performed consistently well in the WACE school rankings and is often amongst the best performing schools in the state.

Notable alumnae
The alumnae of Perth College are commonly referred to as Old Girls and they may join the school's alumni association, the Perth College Old Girls' Association. Some notable Perth College Old Girls include:

Carrie Bickmore – radio and television presenter seen on The Project
Sally Carlton – community and social worker; superintendent in Western Australia of the Australian Women's Land Army during the Second World War
The Hon. Donna Faragher (MLC) – politician; Minister and Parliamentary Secretary in the Barnett Ministry
Jean Elsie Ferguson – hospital matron
Dorothy Hewett – writer
Kate Hooper – water polo player who won a gold medal at the 2000 Summer Olympics in Sydney
Decima Norman – track-and-field athlete who won five gold medals at the 1938 British Empire Games in Sydney
Brianna Throssell – Australian swimmer

See also 

List of schools in the Perth metropolitan area
List of boarding schools

References

Notes

Further reading

External links
Perth College website

Junior School Heads Association of Australia Member Schools in Western Australia
Educational institutions established in 1902
Boarding schools in Western Australia
Anglican primary schools in Perth, Western Australia
Girls' schools in Western Australia
Anglican secondary schools in Perth, Western Australia
Mount Lawley, Western Australia
1902 establishments in Australia
Alliance of Girls' Schools Australasia